The free fraction is a parameter in pharmacokinetics and receptor-ligand kinetics.
One speaks of two different free fractions:
 Plasma free fraction, previously referred to as ƒ1, is now referred to as ƒP according to consensus nomenclature.
 Tissue free fraction (ƒND), previously referred to as ƒ2

The plasma free fraction is the fraction of the ligand at equilibrium in blood plasma that is not bound to plasma proteins.

See also
 Binding potential

References

Others
 

Pharmacokinetics